William Downes Austin (April 6, 1856 – May 25, 1944) was an architect and author in the United States. He was a partner with Frederick W. Stickney at Stickney & Austin from 1892 until 1900. Austin worked out of their Boston office while Stickney worked out of the Lowell office. After the partnership ended in 1900, they both maintained each other's names in their respective practices. One of their first projects was the Highland Club in Lowell.

Austin was born in Dorchester, Massachusetts to William Downes Austin and Catherine D. Austin (daughter of William Austin).

Austin and Stickney both graduated from Massachusetts Institute of Technology.

Austin was the main architect for Boston's Metropolitan Park Commission (MPC), established in 1893, from after its inception up until the mid-1920s.

He wrote a history of the Boston Society of Architects. He was a member of the Boston Society of Architects and American Institute of Architects.

Personal life
Austin married Emily W. Barker of Roxbury, Massachusetts on June 8, 1887, in Boston. Barker's parents were William T. Barker and Emily W. Barker.

Work
Police station at Nantasket Beach Reservation in Hull, Massachusetts
Police station at Blue Hills Reservation in Milton, Massachusetts
Police Station at Charles River Reservation in Newton, Massachusetts 
Revere Beach Reservation bathing pavilions (8), bandstand, bathhouse, police station, and superintendent's house
Nahant Beach Reservation bathhouse, refreshment and waiting room, restrooms, and police station
Jamaica Pond boathouse
Franklin Park Zoo lion house and bird house
Charles River Speedway administration building
South Boston Aquarium in Marine Park The aquarium opened in 1912 and closed in 1954.
120 Riverway in Boston
East Boston Airport administration building
The Fens (Boston, Massachusetts) fieldhouse c. 1928 (demolished 1993)

References

1856 births
1944 deaths
Architects from Boston
Massachusetts Institute of Technology alumni
People from Dorchester, Massachusetts